A national university is mainly a university created or managed by a government, but which may also at the same time operate autonomously without direct control by the state.

Some national universities are associated with national cultural or political aspirations.
For example, the National University of Ireland during the early days of Irish independence collected a large amount of information about the Irish language and Irish culture. In Argentina, the national universities are the result of the 1918 Argentine university reform and subsequent reforms, which were intended to provide a secular university system without direct clerical or government influence by bestowing self-government on the institutions.

List of national universities

Albania

Argentina

 University of Buenos Aires

Australia
 Australian National University

Bangladesh
 National University of Bangladesh

Bhutan
 Royal University of Bhutan

Bosnia and Herzegovina
 University of Sarajevo

Brazil

 University of Brasilia

Brunei
 Universiti Brunei Darussalam

Cambodia
 Institute of Foreign Languages
 Institute of Technology of Cambodia
 National University of Management
 Royal University of Agriculture
 Royal University of Fine Arts
 Royal University of Law and Economics
 Royal University of Phnom Penh
 University of Health Sciences

Canada
 Royal Military College of Canada

Chile
 University of Chile

China

39 Universities in 985 Project 

 Fudan University
 Harbin Institute of Technology
 Nanjing University
 Xi'an Jiao Tong University
 Beihang University
 Beijing Institute of Technology
 Beijing Normal University
 Central South University
 Central University for Nationalities (Minzu University of China)
 Chongqing University
 Dalian University of Technology
 East China Normal University
 Huazhong University of Science and Technology
 Hunan University
 Jilin University
 Ocean University of China
 Tianjin University
 Tongji University
 University of Electronic Science and Technology of China
 Wuhan University
 Xiamen University
 Shandong University
 Sichuan University
 South China University of Technology
 Southeast University
 Sun Yat-sen University
 Peking University
 Shanghai Jiao Tong University
 Tsinghua University
 University of Science and Technology of China
 Zhejiang University
 China Agricultural University
 Lanzhou University
 Nankai University
 National University of Defense Technology
 Northeastern University
 Northwest A&F University
 Northwestern Polytechnical University
 Renmin University of China

Colombia
 National University of Colombia

Costa Rica
Costa Rica Institute of Technology (TEC)
Distance State University (UNED)
National Technical University (UTN)
National University of Costa Rica (UNA)
University of Costa Rica (UCR)

Ecuador 

 Central University of Ecuador

Egypt
 Egyptian e-Learning University
 Galala University
 King Salman International University
 Alamein International University
 New Mansoura University
 Nile University
 Egypt University of Informatics

Equatorial Guinea
 National University of Equatorial Guinea

Eswatini (formerly Swaziland)
University of Eswatini

Guatemala
 Universidad de San Carlos de Guatemala

Guyana
 University of Guyana

India

Institutes of National Importance (91 institutes) 

 All India Institutes of Medical Sciences (7 functioning, 13 upcoming)
 Indian Institutes of Technology (23 functioning)
 National Institutes of Technology (31 functioning)
 Indian Institutes of Information Technology (23 functioning)
 Indian Institutes of Engineering Science and Technology (1 functioning, 2 upcoming)
 Indian Institutes of Science Education and Research (7 functioning, 1 upcoming)
 National Institute of Pharmaceutical Education and Research (7 functioning, 4 upcoming)
 Indian Statistical Institute (Headquartered in Kolkata with 4 branches)
 School of Planning and Architecture (3 functioning)
 Indian Institutes of Management (20 functioning)
'Central Universities of India

 Indian Institute of Science

National Law Universities
National Institute of Science Education and Research
Jamia Millia Islamia
 Indira Gandhi National Open University
 Pondicherry University
 Nalanda University
 Aligarh Muslim University
 Jawaharlal Nehru University
 University of Delhi
 Tezpur University
 Assam University
 North-Eastern Hill University
 Mizoram University
 Rajiv Gandhi University
 Tripura University
 Nagaland University
 Manipur University
 Central University of Rajasthan
 Central University of Kashmir
 Central University of Jammu
 Central University of Gujarat
 Central University of Haryana

Indonesia
 Airlangga University
 Andalas University
 Bandung Institute of Technology
 Bangka Belitung University
 Bogor Agricultural University
 Brawijaya University
 Diponegoro University
 Gadjah Mada University
 Indonesia Institute of Arts, Denpasar
 Indonesia Institute of Arts, Surakarta
 Indonesia Institute of Arts, Yogyakarta
 Jakarta Islamic State University
 Jambi University
Jenderal Soedirman University
 Jember University
 Lampung University
 Padjadjaran University
 Riau University
 Sam Ratulangi University
 Sebelas Maret University
 Sepuluh Nopember Institute of Technology
 Srivijaya University
 State University of Gorontalo
 Sultan Ageng Tirtayasa University
 Syiah Kuala University
 Udayana University
 University of Bengkulu
 University of Indonesia
 University of Mataram
 University of North Sumatra
 University of Nusa Cendana

Iran
 National University of Iran

Ireland
 National University of Ireland

Israel

Japan

Kazakhstan
 Al-Farabi Kazakh National University
 Kazakh National Medical University
 L.N.Gumilyov Eurasian National University

Latvia

Lesotho
 National University of Lesotho

Malaysia
 International Islamic University Malaysia
 National Defence University of Malaysia
 National University of Malaysia
 Sultan Idris Education University
 Tun Hussein Onn University of Malaysia
 Universiti Malaysia Kelantan
 Universiti Malaysia Pahang
 Universiti Malaysia Perlis
 Universiti Malaysia Sabah
 Universiti Malaysia Sarawak
 Universiti Malaysia Terengganu
 Universiti Putra Malaysia
 Universiti Sains Islam Malaysia
 Universiti Sultan Zainal Abidin
 Universiti Teknikal Malaysia Melaka
 Universiti Teknologi MARA
 Universiti Utara Malaysia
 University of Malaya
 University of Science, Malaysia
 University of Technology, Malaysia

Mexico
 National Autonomous University of Mexico
 National Polytechnic Institute

Mongolia
 National University of Mongolia

Myanmar

Pakistan
 National College of Arts
 National Defence University, Islamabad
 National Textile University
 National University of Computer and Emerging Sciences
 National University of Modern Languages
 National University of Sciences and Technology, Pakistan
 Quaid-i-Azam University

Panama
 Universidad Nacional de Panama

Paraguay
 Universidad Nacional de Asuncion
 Universidad Nacional de Concepción
 Universidad Nacional de Itapúa
 Universidad Nacional de Pilar
 Universidad Nacional de Villarrica
 Universidad Nacional del Este

Peru 

 National University of San Marcos
National University of Engineering
National Agrarian University
National University of Education "Enrique Guzmán y Valle"

Philippines

 University of the Philippines System, composed of eight (8) autonomous universities

Poland

Saudi Arabia
 King Saud University

Singapore

 Nanyang Technological University
 National University of Singapore
 Singapore Institute of Technology
 Singapore Management University
 Singapore University of Social Sciences
 Singapore University of Technology and Design

Somalia
 Somali National University

South Korea

Sri Lanka
University of Colombo (Western Province)
University of Peradeniya (Central Province)
University of Ruhuna (Southern Province)
University of Sri Jayewardenepura (Western Province)
University of Kelaniya (Western Province)
University of Moratuwa (Western Province)
University of Jaffna (Northern Province)
Eastern University, Sri Lanka (Eastern Province)
South Eastern University of Sri Lanka, Oluvil (Eastern Province)
Rajarata University (North Central Province)
Sabaragamuwa University of Sri Lanka (Sabaragamuwa Province)
Wayamba University of Sri Lanka, Kuliyapitiya and Makandura (North Western Province)
Uva Wellassa University (Uva Province)
University of the Visual & Performing Arts (Western Province)
 Open University of Sri Lanka(distance education)
 University of Ceylon (defunct)
 University of Sri Lanka (defunct)

Switzerland
 École Polytechnique Fédérale de Lausanne
 ETH Zurich

Taiwan

Among dozens of public universities, including six research universities:
 National Central University
 National Chung Cheng University
 National Cheng Kung University
 National Yang Ming Chiao Tung University
 National Sun Yat-sen University
 National Taiwan University
 National Taiwan University of Science and Technology
 National Taiwan Normal University
 National Tsing Hua University

Thailand
 Burapha University
 Chiang Mai University
 Chulalongkorn University
 Kasetsart University
 Khon Kaen University
 King Mongkut's Institute of Technology Ladkrabang
 King Mongkut's University of Technology North Bangkok
 King Mongkut's University of Technology Thonburi
 Prince of Songkla University
 Mahidol University
 Silpakorn University
 Thaksin University
 Thammasat University
 Ubon Ratchathani University

Ukraine
 National Technical University of Ukraine
 National University of Kyiv-Mohyla Academy
 National Yaroslav Mudryi Law Academy of Ukraine
 Odessa National University
 Oles Honchar Dnipro National University
 Taras Shevchenko National University of Kyiv

United States

 George Washington University (Washington advocated for the establishment of a national university in the U.S. capital in his 1790 State of the Union address)
 Haskell Indian Nations University
 Southwestern Indian Polytechnic Institute
 United States Air Force Academy
 United States Coast Guard Academy
 United States Merchant Marine Academy
 United States Military Academy
 United States Naval Academy

Uruguay
 Universidad de la República

Vietnam
 Vietnam National University, Hanoi
 Vietnam National University, Ho Chi Minh City

See also
 Polytechnics
 Public university
 University Revolution

References 

Lists by country
Lists of universities and colleges
 
Types of university or college